Oğuzhan Biçer (born 17 April 1994) is a Turkish professional footballer who plays as a midfielder for Ankara Demirspor. He made his Süper Lig debut on 18 February 2012.

References

External links
 
 
 Oğuzhan Biçer at goal.com
 

1994 births
Living people
People from Yenimahalle
Footballers from Ankara
Turkish footballers
Association football midfielders
Süper Lig players
MKE Ankaragücü footballers
İstanbulspor footballers
Ankara Demirspor footballers